Andy Anderson may refer to:

Andy Anderson (actor) (born 1947), born in New Zealand, also prominent in Australia
Andy Anderson (American football) (born 1924), American football player and coach
Andy Anderson (baseball) (1922–1982), former professional baseball player
Andy Anderson (drummer) (1951–2019), drummer for English rock band The Cure
Andy Anderson (footballer) (born 1953), Scottish footballer
Andy Anderson (general) (1913–2010), Major General in the U.S. Army and seventh mayor of Naples, Florida
Andy Anderson (record producer) (born 1969), American record producer
Andy Anderson (rower) (born 1954), columnist also known as "Dr. Rowing"
Andy Anderson (skateboarder) (born 1996), Canadian professional skateboarder
Andy Anderson (umpire) (1925–1994), National League baseball umpire
A. C. Anderson (1909–1996), mayor of Lethbridge, Alberta, Canada
Doug Anderson (ice hockey) (1927–1998), Doug "Andy" Anderson, NHL hockey player
H. S. "Andy" Anderson (1893–1960), woodcarver known for the Scandinavian flat-plane carving style

See also
Andrew Anderson (disambiguation)